Citation is the 4th album recorded by alternative country musician Scott Miller.  It was released on March 24, 2006.

Track listing
All tracks by Scott Miller

"Summons" – 0:25
"Freedom Is A Stranger" – 3:44
"Wild Things" – 2:42
"Still People Are Moving" – 4:53
"The Only Road" (Mic Harrison, Brad Henderson, Miller) – 3:34
"Only Everything" – 3:07
"8 Miles A Gallon" – 2:50
"Jody" – 3:04
"Hawks and Doves" (Neil Young) – 3:19
"Say Ho" – 3:00
"On A Roll" – 2:46
"Long Goodnight" – 2:25

Personnel 

Scott Miller - vocals, guitar, harmonica
Kristin Barlowe – photography
Jim DeMain – mastering
Jim Dickinson – producer, liner notes
Eric Fritsch – guitar, keyboards, vocals
Kevin Houston – engineer
Shawn McWilliams – drums, vocals
Jeremy Pennebaker - bass, vocals
Sue Meyer – design

Scott Miller (country musician) albums
2006 albums
Sugar Hill Records albums
Albums produced by Jim Dickinson